Denis Lavant (born 17 June 1961) is a French actor. He is known for his distinctive face and the physically demanding aspects of the roles he plays, which often involve slapstick, acrobatics or dance, as well as for his long-standing association with director Leos Carax. Lavant has played the lead role in all but two of Carax's films. Lavant is also known for his roles in Claire Denis' Beau Travail, and Harmony Korine's Mister Lonely.

Life and career
Lavant was born in Neuilly-sur-Seine, Hauts-de-Seine, in France. At 13, he took courses in pantomime and the circus, fascinated by Marcel Marceau. He trained at the Paris Conservatoire under Jacques Lassalle, and began his professional career in 1982 in theatre, acting in Shakespeare's Hamlet and The Merchant of Venice. In 1982 he appeared in the television film L'Ombre sur la plage, before playing the minor part of Montparnasse in Robert Hossein's Les Misérables, which was entered into the 13th Moscow International Film Festival where it won a Special Prize. He appeared in several further minor roles before making his breakthrough in 1984 as the lead in Boy Meets Girl, playing a depressed, aspiring filmmaker who falls in love with a suicidal young woman. The film marked the directorial debut of Leos Carax, with whose films Lavant has been associated ever since.

In 1986, Lavant and Carax worked together again on the thriller Mauvais Sang and again in 1991 on Carax's third film, Les Amants du Pont-Neuf. In both Mauvais Sang and Les Amants du Pont-Neuf, Lavant starred opposite Juliette Binoche. In 1998, Lavant appeared in the Jonathan Glazer-directed video for the UNKLE song "Rabbit in Your Headlights", and in 1999, he played one of the lead roles in Beau Travail, directed by Claire Denis. In 2007, he appeared in Harmony Korine's Mister Lonely, in which he portrayed a Charlie Chaplin impersonator. Lavant, who does not speak English, took an intensive language course in preparation and learned his lines phonetically. His longtime associate Leos Carax appears in a supporting role as the main character's talent agent.

In 2008, Lavant and Carax re-united for the anthology film Tokyo!, which marked their first work together since Lovers on the Bridge and Carax's first major directing work in nearly a decade. Carax's segment for the film, called "Merde," starred Lavant as a violent monster who lives in the sewers of Tokyo and speaks in a gibberish language, venturing out occasionally to attack passersby.

In 2012, he starred in Leos Carax' film Holy Motors where he plays a "chameleonic actor on assignment, ferried around Paris in a white limousine and changing en route from beggar-woman to satyr to assassin to victim." The film was an entrant at the Cannes Film Festival.

In 2016, he starred in a 30-second clip directed by Yorgos Lanthimos to accompany the song "Identikit" by Radiohead.

Filmography

References

External links

 
 «Cache-cache avec la mort» de Mikhail Volokhov. Mise en scène de Bernard Sobel. Avec Denis Lavant et Hugues Quester.
    CACHE-CACHE AVEC LA MORT / PARIS! PARIS! / LE CALVAIRE DE TCHIKATILO (Coffret VOLOKHOV : de théâtre contemporain russe - VO Russe - Sous-titres : français – anglais – DVD)

1961 births
Living people
People from Neuilly-sur-Seine
French male film actors
French male television actors
French male stage actors
20th-century French male actors
21st-century French male actors